The Hathershaw College is a coeducational, Secondary Academy for 11- to 16-year-olds in Oldham, Greater Manchester, England.

In 2007, Ofsted rated the school as "good".
In 2010, Ofsted described it as "good with outstanding features".
In 2014, the school was judged to be requiring improvement overall.
In 2016, Ofsted described the school as "good".

School history

As the 'Hathershaw Technical High School', it opened in 1955; it had a selective intake. The school was housed in three blocks (a main building, a science block and a craft/engineering block). The school was sponsored by the aviation manufacturer Avro, and the ground plan of the main building was inspired by the outline of a Lancaster bomber. It competed for intake with Oldham's state grammar schools, but offered a more technical syllabus. Provision of equipment and machinery for metalwork and woodwork was considered to be amongst the finest available nationally.

In 1966 the school became a co-educational comprehensive school. In 1970 it was made into an 'upper-school' for pupils in the 14–18 age range, supplied by two separate 'lower-schools', Greenhill and Fitton Hill.  The two feeder schools, which were on sites significantly distant from each other and Hathershaw School, educated pupils from 11 to 14 years of age. In the school year 1977–78 the system was reorganized and Hathershaw again catered for the full 11 to 18 age range, with sixth form entry. The loss of selective entry in 1966 and the system of split-site feeder schools led to a period of falling academic attainment. The trend was reversed after the appointment of John Cole to the headship in 1976. He has been credited as having "transformed Hathershaw School."

In 1981, Oldham's first joint school/community sports hall was built. In a 1992 reorganisation, it became an 11-16 school - losing its sixth form to Oldham Sixth Form College. In December 1999 it was recognised by the government as one of the 50 most improved secondary schools in the country.

In September 2000 the school became a Technology College and in May 2003 was admitted to the Specialist Schools Trust "Value Added" club for significantly improving examination results between Key Stage 2 and Key Stage 4. In November 2004, the school received more than £1 million in lottery funding to improve its sports facilities. Hathershaw became the first dual-specialism school in England, in March 2005, specialising in sport as well as technology. In October 2005, the school opened a £350,000 netball complex.

The OFSTED inspection of November 2007 gave the school an overall rating of "good". In November 2010, the school was re-visited by OFSTED and given the official description 'good with outstanding features'.

On 1 August 2011, The Hathershaw College gained academy status.

In 2016, the College achieved its best GCSE results to date: with 60% gaining 5 A*-C grades including both English and Maths, above both local and national averages. This was equalled in 2017, despite the introduction of the new numerical GCSE grading system in Maths and English.

In April 2016 Ofsted inspection rated the school as "good".

Changes in name
Though an educational establishment in continuous operation from 1955, it has had a number of changes of name:
Hathershaw Technical High School (1955-1966)
Hathershaw Comprehensive School (1966-2000)
Hathershaw College of Technology and Sport (2000-2011)
The Hathershaw College (2011-)

Headteachers at Hathershaw School/College
 Charles Bell, 1955–1967
 John Hemmings, 1967–1976
 John H.S. Cole, 1976–1988 (left his post as Oldham's assistant director of education to take on the school's headship)
 Averil Cunnington (temporary appointment), 1988, later headteacher of Counthill School
 Mr C. Midgely, 1988–1999
 Mr C.W. Edney, 1999–2003
 David Ashley, 2003–2005 (left to become headteacher at Parrs Wood Technology College)
 Carol Cawkwell, 2005–2014 (change of formal title to Principal).
 David McEntee,  2014–2019
 Mark Giles, 2019–

Staff numbers and pupil to teacher ratio
Headcount of all teachers - 72 
Headcount of all teaching assistants - 37 
Headcount of all support (exc. auxiliary) staff - 26 
Pupil to teacher ratio = 15.5:1

Notable former pupils
 Liz McInnes, former Labour MP for Heywood and Middleton.
 David Richards, TV director - This Is Personal: The Hunt for the Yorkshire Ripper, Emmerdale, Coronation Street, Crocodile Shoes etc.
 Colin Waldron, football player - played for Chelsea, Burnley, Manchester United and Sunderland football clubs.

References

External links
Official Hathershaw School website
 Article on the history of the school, by a former pupil and teacher/assistant headteacher.
  Film Archive clip of murals being painted by pupils and staff on the side of the school in 1980.
 Article about a former Hathershaw pupil carrying the Olympic Torch - Chronicle Online.

Secondary schools in the Metropolitan Borough of Oldham
Academies in the Metropolitan Borough of Oldham
Schools in Oldham
Educational institutions established in 1955
1955 establishments in the United Kingdom